Mount Dryfoose is a ridge-type mountain about 2 nautical miles (4 km) long, with peaks rising above , located 3 nautical miles (6 km) northeast of Mount Daniel astride the ridge descending northeast from the south part of the Lillie Range. It was discovered by the U.S. Ross Ice Shelf Traverse Party (1957–58) under A.P. Crary, and named after Lieutenant Earl D. Dryfoose, Jr., U.S. Navy Reserve, a pilot of U.S. Navy Squadron VX-6 during Operation Deep Freeze.

References 

Mountains of the Ross Dependency
Dufek Coast